Tim L. Kapucian (born August 2, 1967) is an American politician who served as a member of the Iowa Senate from the 38th district. A Republican, he served from 2009 to 2021.

Early life and education 
Kapucian was born in Keystone, Iowa. He earned a Bachelor of Science degree in animal science from Iowa State University.

Career 
A farmer, he is the past president of the Iowa Pork Producers. Kapucian was elected in 2008 to the 20th district with 15,527 votes, defeating Democratic opponent Randy Braden.

During his final session in the Senate, Kapuchian served as chair of the Transportation Committee. He was also a member of the Statewide Interoperable Communications System Board.

Personal life 
He resides in Keystone, Iowa with his wife Brenda and two children.

References

External links 
Senator Tim Kapucian official Iowa Legislature site
Senator Tim Kapucian official Iowa General Assembly site
Senator Tim Kapucian at Iowa Senate Republican Caucus
 

Living people
Republican Party Iowa state senators
Iowa State University alumni
1967 births
People from Benton County, Iowa
21st-century American politicians